Curtis Moss  (born April 12, 1987 in New Westminster, British Columbia) is a Canadian track and field athlete competing in the javelin throw. He competed in the javelin throw event at the 2012 Summer Olympics where he finished 22nd with a throw of 78.22 m. He came in first at the 2012 Canadian National Championships in Calgary, achieving an Olympic "A" Standard.  He finished 15th at the 2006 IAAF World Junior Championships in Beijing, China. On May 12, 2012 he set an event record for the javelin throw at the Ponce Grand Prix in Ponce, Puerto Rico, with a distance of 75.32 metres.  His personal best is a distance of 81.21 metres, set on June 13, 2012 in Victoria, British Columbia, Canada.

Moss was suspended in 2015 for a banned substance, methylphenidate, detected in June 2015. His proposed sanction ended January 4, 2016.

Seasonal bests by year
 2003 – 53.21
 2004 – 57.41
 2005 – 68.37
 2006 – 57.77
 2009 – 78.32
 2010 – 74.76
 2011 – 75.53
 2012 – 81.21
 2013 – 76.86

References

External links
 

1987 births
Living people
Canadian male javelin throwers
Olympic track and field athletes of Canada
Athletes (track and field) at the 2012 Summer Olympics
Sportspeople from British Columbia
People from New Westminster
University of British Columbia alumni
UBC Thunderbirds football players
20th-century Canadian people
21st-century Canadian people